Rugby Ralph Lauren was an American clothing brand launched in 2004 under the management of parent company Polo Ralph Lauren, the line has been retired. The brand specialised in Preppy/Rugby inspired lifestyle apparel for male and female clientele ages 16 through 25. Rugby also encompassed Rugby Food & Spirits, a small café modeled after the brand and offering dining inspired by the Rugby theme. Rugby merchandise was available at twelve stores throughout the United States, as well as one in Covent Garden in London, UK. By August, 2008 merchandise was also available online at Rugby.com.

In November 2012, it was announced that Ralph Lauren would be ending the Rugby line by February 2013. On February 5, the Rugby.com website was closed with only links to Ralph Lauren.com remaining.

Brand history and identity

Rugby Ralph Lauren was a concept created by luxury lifestyle apparel designer, Ralph Lauren. The brand's first location opened at 342 Newbury Street in Boston, Massachusetts on October 23, 2004. Rugby's lower price point and edgier styling catered to a younger shopper than Lauren's other luxury clothing brands. Though the company experimented with logos, most of the clothing either carried a small embroidered rugby player, "R.L.F.C", or a skull and crossbones motif. Similarly, the brand adopted its signature colours of yellow and navy stripes on its shopping bags, tags and other promotional material.

The brand consisted of a line of rugby shirts, polos, jackets, suits, dresses, outerwear and accessories, all with a distressed or embellished flair, as well as Rugby Ralph Lauren signature Rugby Football shirts that could be customized by buying patches in-store. Tying in with the brand name, the staple of the concept was the rugby shirt. Originally, these rugby shirts were created in the school colors in the college towns that the Rugby stores resided. Rugby also had a full book of patches that customers could purchase to personalize their rugby shirt in-store. Typically, there were also multiple luxury items in each line such as leather jackets and blazers.

Store locations
Rugby was available through its network of stores or on its website RUGBY.com. The brand held eleven stores and one flagship. Stock was also available in limited quantities in Ralph Lauren Outlet stores.

Store locations
 342 Newbury Street in Boston, Massachusetts - Rugby Ralph Lauren flagship.
 43 King Street, Covent Garden in London, United Kingdom—First European Rugby Ralph Lauren store (Opened September 3, 2011)
 1065 Wisconsin Avenue in Georgetown, Washington, D.C. - The only store to include Rugby Food & Spirits.
 Stanford Shopping Center in Palo Alto, California—Closed January 2010
 2071 Union Street in San Francisco, California
 115 Elm Street in New Canaan, Connecticut
 195 Greenwich Avenue in Greenwich, Connecticut
 1000 West Armitage in Chicago, Illinois
 1123 Emmet St N in Charlottesville, Virginia
 99 University Place in New York City, New York
 380 & 390 Bleecker St. in New York City, New York
 Highland Park Village in Dallas, Texas
 University Village in Seattle, Washington—Closed January 2009
 Main Street in East Hampton, New York 
 Natick Collection in Natick, Massachusetts (now closed)
 Omotesando, Shibuya-Ku in Tokyo, Japan
 The Mall at Short Hills in Short Hills, New Jersey
 Franklin Street in Chapel Hill, NC

All of these locations were closed by February 2013, when the brand ceased trading.

A promotional rugby football was produced and used as a display in the stores. On it was written on the blue side, Ralph Lauren, the other blue side ESTABD 2004 and on both yellow sides of the football RUGBY. This football was located at the Boston store on Newbury Street, Boston, MA.

External links
www.rugby.com - Rugby Ralph Lauren official site
Ralph Lauren vs United States Polo Association

Clothing brands of the United States
Sportswear brands